A schoolyard or school campus is the region within the boundaries of a school used for teaching, extracurricular activities, and playing sports and games.

However, some schools do not use a wall to indicate the range of the schoolyard, in these cases the general activities of teaching and after-school activities can also be called campus life and "schoolyard" or "campus" often is used as a synonym for school life.

The term also may refer to only the outdoor portion of a campus, distinguished from classroom space. In this context, the schoolyard may be used as a teaching space to instruct students about ecological systems. In recent years there has been a growing movement around the world to create "green" schoolyards that incorporate learning gardens, storm water capture elements, and other natural features that promote environmental literacy.

References

See also
Classroom
Cafeteria
Students' union

Educational facilities
Playgrounds